"Real Life Fantasy", abbreviated occasionally as "R.L.F.", is the first official single from Ja Rule's seventh studio album, Pain Is Love 2. The original song samples Bohemian Rhapsody by Queen but the final album version does not, this is because the sample was denied. The song was  released on December 13, 2011.

Three versions of this song were made, the first one was said to be only 30% complete & the other was just a promo. The final version premiered on November 11, 2011 on Ja Rule's SoundCloud the Queen sample was omitted from this version.

Music video
The music video for "Real Life Fantasy" was filmed in May 2011. The song's music video was directed by Hype Williams, who also directed many of Ja Rule's previous videos, such as "Holla Holla", "Murda 4 Life", "Daddy's Little Baby", "How Many Wanna Die", "Between Me and You", "Put It On Me", " Body" and "Wonderful".
It was released on February 1, 2012 on WorldStarHipHop.com and was viewed over 3 million times in the first 24 hours.

Track listing 
Digital download
 "Real Life Fantasy" (featuring Anita Louise) – 3:38

References 
      6. http://www.discogs.com/artist/3787315-Roc-The-Producer

External links

 Ja Rule - Real Life Fantasy Song Lyrics

2011 singles
Ja Rule songs
Music videos directed by Hype Williams
2011 songs
Songs written by Ja Rule
Songs written by Channel 7 (musician)